Johann Dihanich (born 24 October 1958, in Eisenstadt) is a retired Austrian football player.

Club career
A Rapid Wien fan by origin, Hansi Dihanich started his professional career at city rivals Austria Wien and played 8 seasons for them, split in two periods by a season at SS Wacker Innsbruck. In 1987, he joined Grazer AK, before moving to Second Division VÖEST Linz and finishing his career at FavAC.

International career
He made his debut for Austria in October 1980 against Hungary and earned 10 caps in total. He was a member of Austria's squad at the 1982 FIFA World Cup, but did not play in any of their games.

After his playing career, he became an assistant-coach at Austria and GAK and head coach at some lower league sides.

Honours
Austrian Football Bundesliga (5):
 1979, 1980, 1981, 1985, 1986
Austrian Cup (3):
 1980, 1982, 1986

External links
  Player profile - Austria Wien archive
 

1958 births
Living people
People from Eisenstadt
Austrian footballers
Austria international footballers
1982 FIFA World Cup players
FK Austria Wien players
Grazer AK players
FC Wacker Innsbruck players
Austrian Football Bundesliga players
Austrian football managers
Association football midfielders
Footballers from Burgenland
Favoritner AC players
Association football coaches
FK Austria Wien non-playing staff